The James Duane was a fireboat operated by the Fire Department of New York from 1908 to 1959.

The James Duane and her sister ship the Thomas Willett were wooden hulled steam-powered vessels. Their pumps could discharge 9,000 gallons per minute. One of their water cannons was mounted on a tower.

The James Duane was named after the 44th mayor of New York City, James Duane.

See also
 Fireboats of New York City

References

External links
 

Fireboats of New York City
1907 ships
Ships built in Newburgh, New York